Core Audio is a low-level API for dealing with sound in Apple's macOS and iOS operating systems. It includes an implementation of the cross-platform OpenAL.

Apple's Core Audio documentation states that "in creating this new architecture on Mac OS X, Apple's objective in the audio space has been twofold. The primary goal is to deliver a high-quality, superior  audio experience for Macintosh users. The second objective reflects a shift in emphasis from developers having to establish their own audio and MIDI  protocols in their applications to Apple moving ahead to assume responsibility for these services on the Macintosh platform."

History 
It was introduced in Mac OS X 10.0 (Cheetah).

See also 
 Audio Units
 PulseAudio

References

External links 
 Apple's Core Audio page

MacOS APIs
Audio libraries